The Wall of Love (lit. the I Love You Wall) is a love-themed wall of  in the Jehan Rictus garden square in Montmartre, Paris, France. The wall was created in 2000 by calligraphist Fédéric Baron and mural artist Claire Kito and is composed of 612 tiles of enamelled lava, on which the phrase 'I love you' is featured 311 times in 250 languages.

The wall includes the words 'I love you' in all major languages, but also in rarer ones like Navajo, Inuit, Bambara and Esperanto. 
The wall is open to the public free of charge.

Origins
Frédéric Baron first asked his brother, and later his foreign neighbours, to write words of love in their languages, then collected 'I love you' in this way in over 300 languages and dialects of the world.

Claire Kito, a calligrapher, then assembled them in a work to be realised on enamel plates.

Symbolism
The symbolism of the wall was a personal choice of the artist. A wall is, of course, a symbol of division and separation, and here Fédéric Baron wished that a wall could also be a support for the most beautiful of human feelings.

The red splashes on the wall symbolize parts of a broken heart and can be gathered to form a full heart.

References

External links

Official website (English version)

2000 establishments in France
2000s murals
Buildings and structures completed in 2000
Paintings of Montmartre
Buildings and structures in the 18th arrondissement of Paris
Tourist attractions in Paris
Montmartre
Love
Walls